Jere F. Looney was a writer for several American silent films.

Background 
He was a native of Shreveport, Louisiana.

Career 
Looney is best known for writing screenplays for a series of Alice Joyce films. He is also known for writing Milly of Millions, a melodrama-comedy in 3 acts. In 1912, he was one of four scenario writers to win a Universal Film Manufacturing Company contest. However, he has also received negative criticism in the past as well. In 1917, a reviewer gave an unfavorable accounting of The Brand of Satan'''s storyline.

FilmographyThe House of Darkness (1913)The Brand (1914)The Rainbow Girl (1917)The Brand of Satan'' (1917)

References

Silent film screenwriters
Screenwriters from Louisiana
Year of birth missing
People from Shreveport, Louisiana
Year of death missing
Place of death missing
Place of birth missing